The Kyiv Funicular is a steep slope railroad on Kyiv Hills that serves the city of Kyiv, connecting the historic Uppertown, and the lower commercial neighborhood of Podil through the steep Volodymyrska Hill overseeing the Dnieper River. The line consists of only two stations and is operated by the Kyiv city community enterprise Kyivpastrans.

History
The construction cost, about 230,000 rubles, was covered by a Belgian owner of the Kyiv trams. The funicular was the project of Arthur Abrahamson, who received professional training on railroad engineering in Zürich, Switzerland and Saint Petersburg, Russia. The station vestibules were initially developed by N. Pyatnitskiy, and the railway structure was designed by N. Baryshnikov.

Due to its proximity to the St. Michael's Cathedral, it was once named the Mykhailivskyi Mekhanichnyi Pidyom (literally St. Michael's Mechanical Lift). After the cathedral was destroyed by the Soviet authorities in 1935–1936, the name of the funicular was changed.

In 1984 the lower station changed its outlook. It was redeveloped by architects Janos Vig, Valentine Yezhov, and others.

Various facts
The funicular uses the two rail and passing-loop system. The two cars are designated with the Cyrillic letters Λ and П which stand for left and right cars. The funicular was renovated three times: in 1928, 1958, and 1984.

Track gauge: . Total track length: . The total gradient of the slope on which the funicular runs on is 36%. The cable cars are powered by an electric motor which is located inside the upper station and in tram type.

The travel time between the stations is approximately 3 minutes. The route is from the Mykhailivska Square in the Uptown to the Poshtova Square in the Podil. The ticket price is much like for the other city-owned public transportation methods, ₴8 (approx. US$0.3 as of July 2018). The funicular provides daily service to 10,000-15,000 passengers, and annually to 2.8 million passengers.

Originally funicular built as trams were unable to ride the grade. Later funicular fare was included in tram monthly tickets if tram is alone transport in it.

The funicular was closed on September 25, 2006 for restoration, which is usually conducted every year. The total cost of the restoration was expected to be ₴455,400 (about US$90,500). The funicular is operated by Kyivpastrans.

Gallery

See also
 Odessa Funicular
 List of funicular railways

References

External links

 фунікулер in Wiki-Encyclopedia Kyiv 
 Photos of Kyiv Funicular 

Funicular railways in Ukraine
Rail transport in Kyiv
Metre gauge railways in Ukraine
Railway lines opened in 1905
Tourist attractions in Kyiv
1905 establishments in the Russian Empire